13 anys i un dia (English: 13 years and one day) was a Catalan sitcom which was broadcast on TV3 at Thursday nights.  24 episodes were aired between 2008 and 2009. It was produced by Televisió de Catalunya and directed by Jesús Font.

Cast
 Joan Pera
 Roger Pera
 Carmen Balagué
 Lluís Marco
 Alicia González Laá
 Eva de Luis
 José Luis Adserías

References

Spanish television sitcoms
2008 Spanish television series debuts
2009 Spanish television series endings
2000s Spanish comedy television series